João da Rocha Ribeiro (born 13 August 1987) is a Portuguese footballer who plays as a left winger.

Club career
Born in Porto, Ribeiro was brought up in FC Porto's youth system. Still a junior he made his senior debuts, playing only six times in two seasons combined with the reserves in the third division.

Released by Porto, Ribeiro signed a four-year contract with Associação Naval 1º de Maio in the 2006 summer. He made his Primeira Liga debut on 3 December in a 0–2 away loss against C.D. Aves (25 minutes played), and appeared in a further 11 games as the Figueira da Foz club retained its division status.

In the following campaign, Ribeiro became first-choice at Naval, featuring in 27 matches and scoring once as his team finished in 11th position. He missed the vast majority of 2008–09, due to injury.

After one year on loan to fellow league side Associação Académica de Coimbra, Ribeiro left Naval and joined Vitória SC. On 15 January 2011 he netted his first official goal for the Guimarães-based team, in a 1–0 home win over S.C. Olhanense.

Honours
Vitória Guimarães
Taça de Portugal: 2012–13

References

External links

1987 births
Living people
Footballers from Porto
Portuguese footballers
Association football wingers
Primeira Liga players
Liga Portugal 2 players
Segunda Divisão players
FC Porto B players
Associação Naval 1º de Maio players
Associação Académica de Coimbra – O.A.F. players
Vitória S.C. players
S.C. Olhanense players
Süper Lig players
Orduspor footballers
Portugal youth international footballers
Portuguese expatriate footballers
Expatriate footballers in Turkey
Portuguese expatriate sportspeople in Turkey